Chris Wright is a Linux kernel developer and CTO with Red Hat. He was the Linux kernel co-maintainer for the -stable branch with Greg Kroah-Hartman. He is involved in Linux kernel security related topics and is currently the maintainer for the LSM framework.

Chris also serves as the Chair of the OpenDaylight Project Board of Directors.

Chris is vice president and chief technology officer (CTO) at Red Hat.

References 

Linux kernel programmers
Living people
Year of birth missing (living people)